Maurits Hubrecht van den Boogert (born 1972) is a Dutch writer on Ottoman history from about 1700-1900. He studied Orientalism at Leiden University, obtaining his PhD in 2001, and was a researcher in Ottoman history at that institute.

Bibliography
Aleppo Observed: Ottoman Syria Through the Eyes of Two Scottish Doctors, Alexander and Patrick Russell, 2010
The book reviews the text The Natural History of Aleppo. It then critiques the scientific information contained in that book, reviews the biographies of the authors, gives context of the era in which the book was written, and examines the European perspectives of the authors and the era on Syrian culture, religion, and society.
Friends and rivals in the east. Studies in Anglo-Dutch relations in the Levant from the seventeenth to the early nineteenth century, 2000
The book was reviewed in the Low Countries Historical Review.

References

External links
Award Ceremony Sheikh Zayed Book Award, where Boogert accepts an award on behalf of his employer Brill Publishers

1972 births
Living people
Dutch orientalists
Scholars of Ottoman history
Leiden University alumni